Tingena affinis is a species of moth in the family Oecophoridae. It is endemic to New Zealand and has been found in the Nelson region. Adults are on the wing in December and January.

Taxonomy
This species was described by Alfred Philpott in 1926 using specimens collected in Nelson in December and at Dun Mountain in January. Philpott originally named the species Borkhausenia affinis. Philpott illustrated the male genitalia of this species but this illustration is virtually identical to his illustration of the male genitalia of the species now known as Tingena xanthomicta. George Hudson discussed and illustrated this species under the name B. affinis in his 1928 publication The butterflies and moths of New Zealand. In 1988 J. S. Dugdale placed this species within the genus Tingena. The male holotype specimen, collected in Nelson, is held at the New Zealand Arthropod Collection.

Description

Philpott described the species as follows:

Distribution 
This species is endemic to New Zealand. It has been found in the Nelson region.

Behaviour 
Adults of this species are on the wing in December and January.

References

Oecophoridae
Moths of New Zealand
Moths described in 1926
Endemic fauna of New Zealand
Taxa named by Alfred Philpott
Endemic moths of New Zealand